Jana Pareigis (born June 23, 1981 in Hamburg) is a German journalist and television moderator.

Life and career 
Pareigis has a polyethnic migration background with relatives in Germany, Sweden and Zimbabwe. She studied political science and African studies in her hometown of Hamburg as well as in New York City and Berlin. From 2010 she was a TV presenter for the news program Journal at DW-TV as well as a freelance editor, inter alia. for Westdeutscher Rundfunk (WDR), Zeit Online and Deutsche Welle.

Pareigis began her television career as assistant to the editor-in-chief at N24 in Berlin. Before that, she had already gained professional experience in the United Nations Department of Peace Operations, the Reuters news agency and various foundations and newspaper publishers. From December 2014 she moderated ZDF-Morgenmagazin. In 2016 she stood in front of the camera for the DW documentary Afro.Deutschland, which deals with racism against black people living in Germany. Since April 2018 she has been the main presenter of ZDF-Mittagsmagazin. On February 24, 2021, she presented the 12 o'clock heute news on Zweites Deutsches Fernsehen (ZDF) for the first time.

Pareigis wrote a foreword in 2019 for the new German translation of James Baldwin's volume of essays Nach der Flut das Feuer (The Fire Next Time). In it she emphasizes Baldwin's importance for understanding the present and reports on her own experiences with racism.

External links 

 Jana Pareigis on IMDb

References 

1981 births
Living people
German women television journalists
German people of Zimbabwean descent
German people of Swedish descent